The 1920–1924 Pacific hurricane seasons all began during late spring in the northeast Pacific Ocean and the central Pacific. They ended in late fall.

Before the satellite age started in the 1960s, data on east Pacific hurricanes is extremely unreliable.  In a few years, there are no reported cyclones although many systems certainly formed.

1920
Three known tropical cyclones formed this year in the eastern Pacific proper. One of them existed from September 10 to 13. It passed close to the southern tip of the Baja California Peninsula but never made landfall.

1921
Nine tropical cyclones are known this year in the eastern Pacific proper.

II. A system stayed at sea from September 25 to 30. It paralleled the coast of Mexico without making landfall.

III. and IV.  Two possible tropical cyclones exited in the central Pacific during the month of October. The first developed on October 5 near Hawaii, and moved northward until being absorbed by an extratropical storm over the Aleutian Islands. The second was observed on October 17 well to the northeast of Hawaii. For both of these systems, it is unknown what, if any, tropical characteristics they had. It is possible they were Kona-type storms due to their locations.

1922
Seven tropical cyclones formed this year.

I.  One of them was an extremely unusual hurricane that formed between February 6 and 18 and hassled a ship moving between San Pedro and Panama City. This is the only Eastern Pacific hurricane to form in the month of February.

II.  Another cyclone paralleled the coast of Mexico from August 27 to 30. It passed south of the Revilla Gigedo Islands but otherwise stayed at sea.

III.  A "tropical hurricane" formed offshore western Mexico on September 9, and moved northwest, parallel but well offshore the coast, dissipating on September 13.

IV.  A tropical cyclone was tracked from October 14 to 16. It moved northeast and made landfall near Mazatlán.

1923
Five known tropical cyclones existed in the eastern Pacific proper this year.

I.  The initial low pressure area formed on August 20 well southwest of Hawaii. Moving generally westward, it was a small hurricane on August 23 when it was last noted.

II.  A tropical storm formed on October 12. After moving north, it made landfall near Salina Cruz. It crossed the Isthmus of Tehuantepec and emerged into the Bay of Campeche. It strengthened into Atlantic hurricane 6 and eventually made landfall in Louisiana as a weak Category 2.

1924
Three known tropical cyclones formed this year in the eastern Pacific proper.

I.  One was detected on September 2. It stayed at sea and was lost track of on September 8.

II.  Another system was discovered on September 6. It moved in a generally northerly direction. It dissipated on September 9 after making landfall about midway between Acapulco and a place called "C. Corrigules". However, weather associated with it crossed into the Gulf of Mexico.

See also

Pacific hurricane
1920–1938 Pacific typhoon seasons
1920s North Indian Ocean cyclone seasons
 1900–1940 South Pacific cyclone seasons
 1900–1950 South-West Indian Ocean cyclone seasons
 1920s Australian region cyclone seasons

References

Pacific hurricane seasons
1920s Pacific hurricane seasons